This is a list of colonial governors in 1876. This list is organised according to colonial powers and their colonies.

Portugal
 Angola – 
 José Baptista de Andrade, Governor-General of Angola (1873–1876)
 Caetano Alexandre de Almeida e Albuquerque, Governor-General of Angola (1876–1878)

United Kingdom
 Malta Colony – Charles van Straubenzee, Governor of Malta (1872–1878)
 New South Wales – Hercules Robinson, Lord Rosmead, Governor of New South Wales (1872–1879)
 Queensland – William Cairns, Governor of Queensland (1875–1877)
 Tasmania – Major Frederick Weld, Governor of Tasmania (1875–1880)
 South Australia – Sir Anthony Musgrave, Governor of South Australia (1873–1877)
 Victoria – George Bowen, Governor of Victoria (1873–1879)
 Western Australia – Sir William Robinson, Governor of Western Australia (1875–1877)

Colonial governors
Colonial governors
1876